The 2016 Christy Ring Cup was the 12th staging of the Christy Ring Cup hurling championship since its establishment by the Gaelic Athletic Association in 2005. The competition began on Saturday 23 April 2016 and ended on Saturday 25 June 2016.

Kerry were the 2015 champions and were promoted to the All-Ireland Senior Hurling Championship.

In the first final on 4 June 2016 a mistake was made in recording the score. Meath were presented with the Christy Ring Cup as the final score was believed to be Meath 2-18 to Antrim's 1-20. On 7 June 2016 the CCCC ordered that the final be replayed. Meath won the replay on 25 June 2016 after extra time, beating Antrim 4-21 to 5-17.

Format

The 2016 Christy Ring Cup was played in a double-elimination format. For clarity, the draw details are detailed in each round below.

Round 1

All eight teams play in Round 1.

Round 2

Round 2A

Contested by the four winners of Round 1.

Round 2B

Contested by the four losers of Round 1.

Quarter-finals

 
The two losers of round 2A (who won a match and lost a match) play the two winners of round 2B (who lost a match and won a match). These two matches are referred to as quarter-finals.

Semi-finals

The winners of round 2A play the winners of the two quarter-finals.

Final

The winners of this year's Christy Ring Cup final (tier 2) will be automatically promoted to play in the qualifier group of next year's Leinster Senior Hurling Championship.

Controversy

During the final a point that wasn't actually scored was awarded to Meath on the official scoreboard. At the end of the match the score was recorded as Meath 2-18 Antrim 1-20 and the referee mistakenly confirmed this score. Meath were awarded the trophy. On 7 June 2016 the CCCC ruled that the final score was a draw, 2-17 to 1-20, and that the match should be replayed.

Replayed Final

Charity donation

All proceeds from this game were donated to two charities nominated by Meath and Antrim.

Christy Ring/Nicky Rackard play-offs

Bottom play-off

Contested by the two losers from round 2B. Both these teams lost their first two matches.

Relegation/Promotion play-off

The bottom team in this year's Christy Ring Cup (tier 2) plays the winner of this year's Nicky Rackard Cup (tier 3). If the Nicky Rackard champions win the match, they are promoted to next year's  Christy Ring Cup in the place of this year's bottom team.

Scoring statistics

Overall

Top scorers in a single game

References

Christy Ring Cup
Christy Ring Cup
Hurling controversies